Brezje pod Nanosom is a small settlement below the eastern slopes of Mount Nanos in the Municipality of Postojna in the Inner Carniola region of Slovenia.

Name
The name of the settlement was changed from Brezje to Brezje pod Nanosom in 1953.

References

External links

Brezje pod Nanosom on Geopedia

Populated places in the Municipality of Postojna